In mathematics, Göbel's sequence  is a sequence of rational numbers defined by the recurrence relation

with starting value

Göbel's sequence starts with
 1, 1, 2, 3, 5, 10, 28, 154, 3520, 1551880, ... 
The first non-integral value is x43.

Generalization
Göbel's sequence can be generalized to kth powers by

The least indices at which the k-Göbel sequences assume a non-integral value are
43, 89, 97, 214, 19, 239, 37, 79, 83, 239, ...

References

External links
Göbel's Sequence

Integer sequences
Recurrence relations